Andrej Pátricka (born 19 September 1975) is a Slovak cross-country skier. He competed in the men's relay event at the 1998 Winter Olympics.

References

External links
 

1975 births
Living people
Slovak male cross-country skiers
Olympic cross-country skiers of Slovakia
Cross-country skiers at the 1998 Winter Olympics
People from Kremnica
Sportspeople from the Banská Bystrica Region